The Argentine Interior Security System ( or SSI) is the official name of the public security service of Argentina.

The Interior Security System consists of the following individuals, agencies and dependencies:
 President of Argentina
 Governors and police agencies of the Argentine provinces
 Argentine National Congress
 Ministries of Interior, Security, Defence, and Justice
 Policía Federal Argentina (Argentine Federal Police; PFA)
 Gendarmería Nacional Argentina (Argentine National Gendarmerie; GNA)
 Prefectura Naval Argentina (Argentine Naval Prefecture; PNA)

The Interior Security System came online with the 1991.

See also 
 Argentine Federal Police
 Argentine National Gendarmerie
 Argentine Naval Prefecture
 Buenos Aires Police
 Santa Fe Province Police

Notes

External links 
 Interior Security Law 24.059 

Law enforcement in Argentina